Roshcha is a rural locality (a village) in Kletnyansky District, Bryansk Oblast, Russia. The population was 34 as of 2010. There are 2 streets.

Geography 
Roshcha is located 11 km north of Kletnya (the district's administrative centre) by road. Kozenkovka is the nearest rural locality.

References 

Rural localities in Kletnyansky District